Han Sung-gyu (born 27 January 1993) is a South Korean footballer currently playing as a midfielder. He is the brother of Han Seung-gyu.

Club career

International career

Career statistics

Club

Notes

References

External links
 

1993 births
Living people
People from Suwon
South Korean footballers
Association football midfielders
K League 1 players
K League 2 players
Pohang Steelers players
Expatriate footballers in Cambodia